Jewelled Nights is a 1925 Australian silent film directed by the film star Louise Lovely in collaboration with her husband Wilton Welch. Only part of the film survives today.

Synopsis
After her father's death, socialite Elaine Fleetwood promises to marry a man she does not love. However, she leaves him at the altar during a wedding ceremony, cuts her hair and decides to disguise herself as a boy and go prospecting in northwest Tasmania. She meets a handsome miner who figures out she is a woman, saves her from a villain and marries her.

Cast
Louise Lovely as  Elaine Fleetwood             
Gordon Collingridge as Larry Salarno
Godfrey Cass as Tiger Sam
Arthur Styan as Crank Ned
Grafton Williams as Red Roof
John Dobbie as Tiny Tim
Charles Brown as Gus
Harry Halley as wowser
Leslie Woods as Robert Milton
Robert Morgan as Sir John Fleetwood
Clifford Miller as Richard Fleetwood
George Bryant as Dr Mason
Reg Leslie as Frank Reid
Frank Dunn as Dr Hughes
Katrina Barry as Lady Fleetwood
Lucille de Rago as Netta
Joy Law as Nora Foster
Jean Foulis as Yvette

Production
The film was made by Lovely after her return from Hollywood in 1924. She and her husband helped set up a company, Louise Lovely Productions, worth £30,000. Among her backers were several businessmen who worked with Arthur Shirley's Pyramid Pictures.

They constructed an elaborate £3,000 studio which contained several large sets, and shot on location at Flemington Racecourse and in Tasmania. This caused to budget to spiral. The sets were used to film a storm in the Tasmanian rain forest.

Reception
Jewelled Nights premiered in Tasmania at The Strand, which was attended by Marie Bjelke Petersen, who wrote the original novel, and future-Prime Minister Joseph Lyons (then-Premier of Tasmania), who commended her writing achievements for promoting Tasmania abroad. The film was well attended at first, being seen by an estimated 350,000 people in Melbourne and 9,000 in Hobart. However it was unable to recover its costs. Lovely partly attributed to this to the amount of money taken by distributors and exhibitors – she claimed that in one week in Melbourne the film took £1,565 out of which the producers received £382.

Lovely subsequently retired from filming and divorced Welch.

Reconstruction
Only two minutes of the film were thought to have survived, along with stills taken during shooting. However using photographic reconstruction, newly found footage, animation and a copy of the original novel annotated by Lovely, archivists have manage to reconstruct 20 minutes of the film. This plays daily at the Gaiety Theatre in Zeehan (part of the West_Coast_Heritage_Centre), near where the movie was shot.

References

External links

Jewelled Nights at National Film and Sound Archive

1925 drama films
1925 films
1925 lost films
Australian drama films
Australian black-and-white films
Australian silent feature films
Films based on Australian novels
Films set in Tasmania
Lost Australian films
Lost drama films
Silent drama films
1920s English-language films